James Allen (born June 16, 1954) is an American antique collector, known in particular for his collection of 145 photographs of lynchings in America, published in 2000 with Congressman John Lewis as Without Sanctuary: Lynching Photography in America. The collection includes images of the lynching in 1911 of Laura and Lawrence Nelson, in Okemah, Oklahoma, and of Leo Frank in 1915 near Marietta, Georgia.

Background
Allen was raised in Winter Park, Florida, within an Irish-Catholic family of 11 brothers and sisters. In an interview for The Los Angeles Times in 2000, Allen said he didn't fit in, and was thrown out of the house at 18 when his father discovered he was gay. He developed a fascination for rare objects from a young age, and when he left home began to make a living as a "picker". Some of his objects are now housed by the Smithsonian and the High Museum of Art in Atlanta. Allen appeared in the third episode of BBC's Racism: A History documentary series where he displays and discusses part of his photograph collection.

Works
Allen, James and Lewis, Jon. Without Sanctuary: Lynching Photography in America. Twin Palms Publishers, 2000.

Notes

Further reading

Allen James. Musarium: Without Sanctuary, accessed January 14, 2014.
A brief film by Allen about his collection, accessed January 14, 2014.

Lynching in the United States
American collectors
LGBT historians
LGBT people from Florida
Living people
1954 births
Place of birth missing (living people)
People from Winter Park, Florida